Potawatomi Hotel & Casino, formerly Potawatomi Bingo Casino, is a Native American casino in Milwaukee, Wisconsin, United States, owned and operated by the Forest County Potawatomi Community. It first opened its doors March 7, 1991. Located on Canal Street in the Menomonee Valley near Downtown Milwaukee, this entertainment destination offers a variety of entertainment options, including a 20-table poker room, multiple restaurants and dining options, a food court (with several vendors/small restaurants), a (coming soon) sports book (formerly the Northern Lights Theater), and the Sky Lodge (a smoke-free casino). It's a popular destination spot for visitors outside of Milwaukee.

History 
The casino underwent an expansion that was completed in the summer of 2008, expanding the number of table games to 60 and slot machines to over 3,000. The connected hotel stands eighteen stories high (numbered as nineteen due to the common exclusion of the thirteenth floor), and is the tallest habitable structure in the city west of Interstate 94 (with the roof of Miller Park nearby standing 70 feet higher).

In May 2017, Potawatomi Hotel & Casino announced that it wants to expand the hotel with the construction of a second tower. The second tower is expected to cost around $80 million and will house 119 rooms and suites, bringing the hotel's total number to 500. The 180,000-square-foot addition will also feature a spa and additional meeting space. It opened for business in the spring of 2019.

Gaming

There are more than 3,000 machines for gaming as well as 100 poker and table games.

The 24/7 poker room (currently closed) includes a mix of Limit and No-Limit Texas Hold ’Em, Seven Card Stud, and Pot Limit Omaha.

See also
List of casinos in Wisconsin 
List of casino hotels
 Tending the Fire

References

External links

Official Website

Casinos completed in 1991
1991 establishments in Wisconsin
Casinos in Wisconsin
Potawatomi
Buildings and structures in Milwaukee
Tourist attractions in Milwaukee
Skyscraper hotels in Wisconsin
Skyscrapers in Wisconsin
Native American casinos
Native American history of Wisconsin